Politis may refer to

Media
 Politis (Cyprus), a daily newspaper 
 Politis (magazine), a weekly left-wing French magazine

People
Athanase George Politis (1893–1968), Greek diplomat and historian
Dimitris Politis (born 1995), Greek footballer 
Fotos Politis (1890–1934), Greek stage director 
Kostas Politis (1942–2018), Greek basketball player 
Lampros Politis (born 1995), Greek footballer 
Nikolaos Politis (1872–1942), Greek diplomat
Nick Politis (born 1944), Australian businessman

Nikos E. Politis (died 2005), Greek writer, journalist, and historian 
Vasilis Politis (born 1963), Greek philosopher

See also

Politi (disambiguation)